FC Ahrotekhservis Sumy was the Ukrainian football club based in Sumy, Ukraine.

The club entered the competition of the Ukrainian SSR in the Soviet Second League in 1990. Soon after that the club became the member of the Ukrainian First League. Avtomobilist was not a successful team and soon in 1996 it lost its professional status. In 1994 the club changed its name to SBTS. For a single season in 1994–95 the team was simply named as FC Sumy. Before its relegation and losing its professional license in 1996 the name was changed to Ahrotekhservis.

Previous names of the club 
1965–1993 – Futbol'nyi Klub "Avtomobilist" Sumy (Football Club Avtomobilist Sumy)
1993–1994 – Futbol'nyi Klub SBTS Sumy (Football Club SBTS Sumy)
1995 – Futbol'nyi Klub "Sumy" (Football Club Sumy)
1996 – Futbol'nyi Klub "Ahrotekhservis" Sumy (Football Club Ahrotekhservis Sumy)

See also
FC Frunzenets Sumy
FC Spartak Sumy
FC Yavir Krasnopilya

 
Avtomobilist Sumy, FC
Association football clubs established in 1965
Avtomobilist Sumy, FC
Avtomobilist Sumy, FC
1965 establishments in Ukraine
1996 disestablishments in Ukraine